The 2009 Monte Paschi Strade Bianche - Eroica Toscana was the third edition of the Strade Bianche road bicycle race, held on 7 March 2009 in Tuscany, Italy. The race was 190 km, starting in Gaiole in Chianti and finishing in Siena, and included eight sectors of strade bianche, totaling 57,2 km of gravel road. Compared to the previous edition of the Strade Bianche, the race was 10 km longer and featured one more sector of sterrato.

Swedish rider Thomas Lövkvist won the race ahead of German Fabian Wegmann and Swiss Martin Elmiger. Linus Gerdemann attacked five kilometres from the finish, but faded on the steep climb to the centre of Siena and was caught and passed by a chase group. Thomas Lövkvist powered up the cobbled street and was the first to enter the Piazza del Campo and crossed the line 4 seconds ahead of Wegmann and Elmiger. Edvald Boasson Hagen was fourth at eight seconds.

Results

Notes

References

External links 

Strade Bianche
Strade Bianche
Strade Bianche